Patrice Martin (born 28 August 1956) is a Beninese boxer. He competed in the men's lightweight event at the 1980 Summer Olympics. At the 1980 Summer Olympics, he lost to Yordan Lesov of Bulgaria.

References

1956 births
Living people
Beninese male boxers
Olympic boxers of Benin
Boxers at the 1980 Summer Olympics
Place of birth missing (living people)
Lightweight boxers